High Way Race is an arcade auto racing game released by Taito in April 1983.

Gameplay
The player is taking part in a cross country auto race. Other cars on the track will attempt to crash into the player car, but if they cannot be dodged, the player car has the ability to jump to avoid them. The player has unlimited lives, but each collision—either with opponent cars or other obstacles—will deplete the car's fuel supply, and the game will end if the car runs out of fuel.

Around the race's halfway mark, a fuel truck appears with fueling arms to its left and right. The player car can refuel by contacting either of the arms, as long as it does not collide with the truck itself.

As the player reaches the end of the race course, signs on the track will count down to the finish line. The player vehicle must jump prior to the finish, otherwise it will crash into the water below, ending the game. A successful jump does not mean the race is completed, as the player must, upon landing, use the brakes to safely bring the car to a stop. Points are awarded for remaining fuel at the end of the race, and the player will advance to the next race course.

Ports
High Way Race was released on February 24, 2022 by Hamster Corporation as part of their Arcade Archives collection for the Nintendo Switch.

See also
Bump 'n' Jump

References

External links

1983 video games
Top-down racing video games
Arcade video games
Arcade-only video games
Nintendo Switch games
PlayStation 4 games
Taito arcade games
Taito SJ System games
Video games developed in Japan
Hamster Corporation games